James Moorhouse (19 November 1826 – 9 April 1915) was a Bishop of Melbourne and a Bishop of Manchester, and a Chancellor of the University of Melbourne.

Early life and career
Moorhouse was born in Sheffield, England, the only son of James Moorhouse, a book-lover and master-cutler, and his wife Jane Frances née Bowman. Educated at a private school at Sheffield until he was 16, Moorhouse afterwards went to the People's College in the evenings. He was widely read and already taking an interest in theological and philosophical books. His father intended the younger Moorhouse to become a partner in his cutlery business, but after spending two or three years at this work, Moorhouse asked that he might be sent to a university with a view to ordination. He never regretted the years he spent in business, as he realised that the experience of men he had gained was invaluable. Moorhouse knew little Latin, and no Greek or higher mathematics, so there was much to be learned before at the age of 23 he was able to enter St John's College, Cambridge (graduated BA, 1853 as a senior optime in the mathematical tripos; MA, 1860; DD, 1876).

Ordained as a priest in 1854, Moorhouse served as curate at St Neots and at Sheffield (1855–59) to Canon Sale. There he started a men's institute where young men could meet and discuss, and open their minds. He began the work single-handed and many of the men who came were rough specimens. When he left there were 400 students and a staff of voluntary teachers. Moorhouse then became curate to Canon Harvey at Hornsey, the beginning of a great friendship, and in 1861 he was appointed select preacher before the university of Cambridge. His sermons, which made a great impression, were published in that year under the title, Some Modern Difficulties Respecting the Facts of Nature and Revelation. He was much gratified to receive an invitation from his old college, St John's, to sit for a fellowship, but was obliged to decline the honour as on 12 September 1861 he had married Mary Lydia Sale, the daughter of his former vicar. He was soon afterwards appointed to the living at St John's, Fitzroy Square, London. His income was small and the parish was a drab one, but his preaching attracted well-to-do people from other parts of London, who took sittings in his church. This, however, did not lead to any neglect of the poorer members of his congregation. He opened classes for young men and himself took the classes in English, the Greek Testament and political economy. Nothing pleased him better than a discussion on some point with one of the keener-minded men of his audience. On other occasions he would play football with members of his class. In 1867 he became vicar of Paddington, and during the following nine years established a reputation as one of the most eloquent and weighty of metropolitan preachers. He was then appointed prebendary canon of St Paul's Cathedral in 1874.

Bishop of Melbourne
Moorhouse's distinguished record and many notable publications led to an offer of the see of Melbourne, vacated by Charles Perry. Consecrated at Westminster Abbey on 22 October 1876, Moorhouse was installed on 11 January 1877 at St James's Cathedral, William Street, Melbourne.

When Moorhouse arrived at Melbourne he found much work was needed. Before the discovery of gold 25 years before, Melbourne was a small provincial town, it was now an established city with a quarter of a million inhabitants. Much as the churches had done it had been difficult to keep pace with such progress, and Moorhouse realised that men of ability should be encouraged to become clergymen, and that they should be properly trained. Trinity College had recently been built and affiliated with the University, and Moorhouse decided that if possible all candidates for orders should reside there for three years and take a degree. He had been presented with £1000 by his parishioners when he left London, and this was now given to the fund founded to meet the expenses of the students while at college. It is interesting to know that practically within the span of Moorhouse's life Trinity College contributed six bishops to the Anglican church. He travelled the country widely and made friends wherever he went, and especially stressed the need for the religious instruction of children. His difficulties were great and he found the dissensions between the various religious bodies a greater bar than the opposition of sceptics. Writing in the late 1870s he said, "The hatred of Rome here is incredible. I could have gained my object long ago but for that. . . . Nothing will induce me to join in the bigoted howl against Rome." In 1881, however, he was able to assure a friend in England that the prospects of religious instruction in schools were much brighter. His broad-mindedness appealed to many outside his own denomination. He began delivering a series of lectures in the autumn of each year on the Bible, on the gospel and city life of Corinth, on religion and science. At first given in one of the churches his audiences grew until it was necessary to engage the town hall, which held about three thousand. Without aiming at popularity Moorhouse filled this hall with people of all classes and creeds, who listened with the greatest intentness to all he said. 

Moorhouse had realised that it was necessary that there should be a worthy cathedral at Melbourne. After much discussion the site was chosen as the corner of Swanston and Flinders Streets and William Butterfield as the architect, but the raising of the money became a great problem. He was heartened by a gift of £10,000 from Sir William Clarke, and even more by the receipt of £5000 from an anonymous Presbyterian, who was subsequently found to be Francis Ormond. The foundation stone of St Paul's Cathedral, Melbourne was laid on 13 April 1880 and the building was completed except for the spires in 1891. Another important question of the time was the framing of the constitution of the Church in Australia. A general synod was held at Sydney, and in the absence of the bishop of Sydney in England, Moorhouse was chosen to be chairman. The problems to be dealt with held many difficulties and at the previous synod held five years before, time had been wasted and tempers tried, without result. There can be no question that the eloquence and earnestness of Moorhouse had much to do with the success of the meeting. He was able to report: "We worked like brothers without a single casual or vexatious objection. . . . I believe we have settled our constitution on primitive lines, and in such a way that no deadlock can arise in the future." 

In 1882 Moorhouse told the Melbourne Church Assembly (Synod) of his intention to establish a Melbourne Deaconesses Home, building on the experience of the English Church since the revival of the Order of Deaconesses there in 1861. This would provide an authorised form of ministry for women, to work in areas such as education and what was then described as "rescue work" among the poorer areas of Melbourne. On 8 February 1884 he ordained Marion Macfarlane as a deaconess at Christ Church, South Yarra, the first ordination of a woman in the Australian Anglican Church. 

Moorhouse's journeys about the country had taught him how severely people suffered in times of drought. He became one of the pioneers of irrigation, and gave courses of lectures showing what had been done in other countries. When asked to issue a special form of prayer for rain he said people were quite at liberty to use the prayer in the prayer-book, but that they should remember that it was their own lack of foresight which allowed so much water to run to waste, and it was their duty to remedy their own neglect. The story that his reply was that "he would pray for rain if they would dam their rivers" is not correct. When asked of the truth of this in later years, Moorhouse said he regretted he had not had the wit at the moment to put it so crisply. His many activities were putting some strain on him when he received a cablegram offering him the see of Manchester. He accepted this offer and left Victoria to the regret of all who had been associated with him.
An enthusiastic lecturer, debater and participant in the public life of Australia, he was elected chancellor of the University of Melbourne in 1884.

Bishop of Manchester
In 1885, Moorhouse was appointed Bishop of Manchester. He left Melbourne on 10 March 1886 and was enthroned as the third Bishop of Manchester on 18 May 1886 when nearly 60 years of age, but his energy was not abated. He made visitation tours of the 600 parishes in his diocese and became familiar with their peculiar difficulties. There had been strife in connexion with ritual in the diocese which had caused much ill-feeling, and here he successfully strove for peace. His preaching and lecturing lost none of its force and fervour, but after he reached 75 years of age in 1901 he began to suffer from bronchitis and loss of sleep.

He received the honorary degree Doctor of Literature (DLitt) from the Victoria University of Manchester in February 1902 in connection with the 50th jubilee celebrations of the establishment of the university.

Late life and legacy
Moorhouse retired in 1903 to Taunton, Somerset; his wife died in August 1906. He had no children, but his wife's niece, Miss Edith Sale, was able to occupy the place of a daughter and be a companion to him. He kept up his habit of reading but took no further part in church work. He died in Taunton on 9 April 1915. The more important of his books include Our Lord Jesus Christ, the Subject of Growth in Wisdom (1866), The Expectation of the Christ (1878), The Teaching of Christ (1891), Dangers of the Apostolic Age (1891), and Church Work its Means and Methods (1894). His portrait at the time of his leaving Manchester was painted by Sir George Reid. A marble bust by Percival Ball is at the national gallery, Melbourne. 

Moorhouse was tall and big framed, a good cricketer and footballer in his youth and an excellent boxer. He was unpretentious in manner, and at Melbourne he at first astonished some people by smoking a pipe and going on his walks accompanied by a bulldog. He was thoroughly broad-minded and interested in current events, with a keen eye for humbug and priggishness. His sternness of feature and apparent coldness concealed from those who did not know him his great kindness of heart and strength of feeling. He was a tremendous worker and student, he had a clear logical mind, a sense of humour, great sincerity, and a natural gift of eloquence. These combined made him a remarkable preacher and lecturer and a great representative of his Church. He had a considerable influence on the life of Melbourne from 1876 to 1886 and those who had met him never forgot him.

References

External links
 

1826 births
1915 deaths
Bishops of Manchester
Anglican bishops of Melbourne
Australian people of English descent
Alumni of St John's College, Cambridge
Chancellors of the University of Melbourne